John Gavin (1931–2018) was an American film actor and former United States Ambassador to Mexico.

John Gavin may also refer to:

John Gavin (comedian) (born 1979), Scottish comedian
Johnny Gavin (footballer) (1928–2007), Irish footballer, record goalscorer for Norwich City F.C.
John Gavin (director) (1875–1938), Australian film director
John Gavin (convict) (1829–1844), Australian convict
Johnny Gavin (Rescue Me), fictional character on the American television series Rescue Me